Ernest Favenc (21 October 1845 – 14 November 1908) was an explorer of Australia, a journalist, author of verse, novels and short stories, and an historian.

Personal life
Favenc was born in Walworth, Surrey, England. Of Huguenot descent, he was the son of Abraham George Favenc, merchant, and his wife Emma, née Jones. He was educated at the Werdersches Gymnasium, Berlin and at Temple College, Cowley, Oxfordshire.

Favenc arrived in New South Wales in 1864, and, after being in the colony for about a year, in a commercial position, he afterwards worked in the pastoral industry in the frontier squatting districts of Queensland.

Favenc married Elizabeth Jones Matthews on 15 November 1880 in Sydney. Favenc died at his Darlinghurst home in Sydney on 14 November 1908, and was survived by Elizabeth Jane and their daughter.

Exploration 
In July 1878 the proprietor of The Queenslander newspaper employed him to explore the country along the western border of Queensland to Darwin to evaluate the possibility of connecting the Queensland Railways to Port Darwin. The journey took him six months, and he reported that such a line would be feasible. Unusually for the period, his wife Emma was also part of the expedition party. 

In the early 1880s he also undertook expeditions in the country to the south of the Gulf of Carpentaria and to the headwaters of the Murchison, Gascoyne and Ashburton rivers of Western Australia.

Writing
Favenc's first publication was The Great Austral Plain in 1887. The Last of Six: Tales of the Austral Tropics appeared in 1893, followed by The Secret of the Australian Desert (a short novel) in 1895, Marooned on Australia and The Moccasins of Silence, both in 1896.

Favenc also wrote under the pseudonym of "Dramingo", often for The Queenslander, and was an accomplished pencil sketcher. He also published romances, children's stories and verse as well as several books on exploration, the most extensive being The History of Australian Exploration from 1788 to 1888.

On the original launch of this book in 1888 the Sydney, Australia Daily Telegraph reported:

{{cquote|The History of Australian Exploration is an important one and however diverse may have been the aims, ideas and successes of those by whom the work was done,...Ernest Favenc's rather formidable volume...gathers together all those scattered memorials merging it into a unity of a great labour. Favenc was himself an explorer and treats his subject not in a perfunctory way, but as one who feels the wild charm and the magical attraction of the unknown...}}

Works
 A Romance of Kangaroo Point (1876). (written as "Dramingo" and first published in The Queenslander)
 The Great Austral Plain (1887).
 The History of Australian Exploration from 1788 to 1888 (1888).
 The Last of Six: Tales of the Austral Tropics (1893).
 The Secret of the Australian Desert  (1895).
 The Moccasins of Silence (1896).
 Marooned on Australia: Being the Narration by Diedrich Buys of his Discoveries and Exploits in Terra Australis Incognita (1896). 
 The Explorers of Australia and their Life-work'' (1908).

References

External links
 Works by Favenc at Project Gutenberg of Australia
 

 

1845 births
1908 deaths
Exploration of Australia
Explorers of Australia
19th-century Australian historians
19th-century Australian novelists
19th-century male writers
19th-century Australian short story writers
19th-century Australian poets
19th-century Australian journalists
19th-century Australian male writers
Australian male journalists